SDI - Strategic Defense Initiative, or simply titled SDI and sometimes known as Global Defense, is a 1987 horizontally scrolling shooter produced and released internationally in arcades by Sega. It was later ported to home computers and game consoles, some by other companies. Players control a satellite and must destroy enemies by moving a crosshair over them and firing the satellite's weapons.

Gameplay
Players control a Strategic Defense Initiative satellite orbiting the Earth and must destroy enemy missiles/satellites with its weapons, and when activated the satellite's weapon systems fire at the crosshair present onscreen during play. The arcade version features a joystick to control the satellite and a trackball to control the crosshair. Home computer versions use different control schemes, such as depressing the fire button to control the crosshair, alternating between controlling the satellite and its weapons. It is also possible to use a joystick and mouse in combination to control the satellite and crosshair at the same time, emulating the arcade game's controls.

Each stage is split into two sections; offensive mode and defensive mode. During offensive mode the player engages a number of enemies, with the aim of destroying them all without the satellite being destroyed by the enemy. Should the player destroy all enemies during offensive mode, they are awarded 20,000 bonus points and begin the next stage on the offensive. If any enemies evade destruction during offensive mode, the player must complete defensive mode, where they are tasked with protecting the homeland from incoming warheads. Completion of defensive mode advances the player to the next stage, where they go on the offensive again.

This so-called "Star Wars" program was introduced by U.S. President Reagan to promote defensive weaponry that could shoot ICBMs out of space.

Reception 
In Japan, Game Machine listed SDI on their June 1, 1987 issue as being the sixth most-successful table arcade unit of the month.

References

External links

1987 video games
Amiga games
Amstrad CPC games
Arcade video games
Cold War video games
Sega arcade games
Atari ST games
Commodore 64 games
Sega video games
Master System games
Horizontally scrolling shooters
Strategic Defense Initiative
Trackball video games
Video games set in outer space
ZX Spectrum games
Activision games
Video games developed in Japan

ja:SDI (ゲーム)